Mulayam  is a village in Thrissur district in the state of Kerala, India.

Demographics
 India census, Mulayam had a population of 7416 with 3676 males and 3740 females.

The Rudhiramala Bhagavati Temple is one of the most famous temples of the locality. The temple feast is celebrated across religions. Another famous temple in the region is Panangattukkara Sri Ayyappankavu Temple. It is one of the most ancient temple in the region - it may be 5000 years old.

It was little known to the outside world until 1983, SOS children's villages were established in Mulayam. It is an international non-governmental organisation for children across 134 countries in the world. In 1998, Marymatha Major Seminary, Trichur was established in Mulayam. The seminary has been noted very soon due to its innovative, people-oriented, pastorally sound theology and priestly formation.

The feast of St. Patrick Church, the local parish Church is also celebrated by all religious communities.

Major institutions
 Panangattukara Sri Ayyappankavu Temple
 Damian Leprosy Home
 Sri Lakshmi Narasimhaswami Temple
 Purapadiyam Sri mahavishnu Temple
 Marymatha Major Seminary
 Sree Rudhiramala Bhagavathi Temple
 SOS Children's Village
 SJB House (ConGregation of St John the Baptist)
 Divine Union Vocationary (Vocationist Fathers)
 St. Patrick's Church
 Home of Love
 Don Bosco Central School
 Sree Narayanaguru Mandiram
 Sree Sarani Vanadurga  Bhadrakali Temple

References

Villages in Thrissur district